Gibson Lake is the cooling pond for Duke Energy Indiana's Gibson Generating Station. Opened to fishing in 1978, Gibson Lake had been a prime source of bass and several types of catfish, bluegill, and carp. The lake was closed to fishing in 2007, due to elevated levels of selenium found in the water of the lake. The only entrance to Gibson Lake is the lake's boat ramp, located due southeast of the plant on Gibson County Road 975 South.

Wildlife
The Gibson Lake and the rest of the Gibson Generating Station complex is home to several species of birds. They include:

 Red-throated loon
 Pacific loon
 Eared grebe
 Red-necked grebe
 Western grebe
 American white pelican
 Brown pelican
 Plegadis ibis
 Snowy egret
 Ross's goose
 Wood stork
 White-faced ibis
 Glossy ibis
 Black-bellied whistling duck
 White-winged scoter
 Surf scoter
 Long-tailed duck
 Golden eagle
 Peregrine falcon
 Wild turkey
 King rail
 Piping plover 
 Least tern
 Green heron
 Canada goose
 Cackling goose

 American avocet
 Black-necked stilt
 Whimbrel
 Marbled godwit
 Hudsonian godwit
 Purple sandpiper
 Red knot
 Red phalarope
 Laughing gull
 Little gull
 Sabine's gull
 Glaucous gull
 Iceland gull
 Thayer's gull
 Lesser black-backed gull
 Pomarine jaeger
 Parasitic jaeger
 Swainson's hawk
 Gyrfalcon
 Snowy owl
 Le Conte's sparrow
 Henslow's sparrow 
 Great blue heron
 Whooping crane
 White-fronted goose
 Mallard duck
 Snow goose
 Blue and green-winged teal

 Many of these birds use the area as a stop-over on their respective destinations. Wildlife and bird watchers will notice that Google Earth and Garmin GPS maps refer to the lake's location as Broad Pond. The ancient Broad Pond-Cane Ridge-Wabash River oxbow was once considered for a National Wildlife Refuge.

Specialty species
Least terns - breed at Gibson Lake and Cane Ridge least tern habitat and may be seen anytime between mid-May and late August or early September.
Bald eagles - are common during the winter and are usually encountered on a drive around the levee. They nest in the area next to the Wabash River.

Temperature
The lake temperature very rarely falls below  at its coldest point, due mainly to the plant's condenser discharges. This often results in lake-effect snow or heavy frost falling in nearby areas.

Outflow (West) Side

Inflow (East) Side

The two sides are separated by a splitter dike that juts approximately 500 yards into the lake  from the main plant that forces the water to remain in the lake for around 1–2 weeks.

References

Protected areas of Gibson County, Indiana
Owensville, Indiana
Reservoirs in Indiana
Bodies of water of Gibson County, Indiana
Duke Energy
Cooling ponds